Richard Wayne Goldberg (born September 23, 1927) is a Senior United States Judge of the United States Court of International Trade.

Education and career

Goldberg was born in 1927 in Fargo, North Dakota. He received a Bachelor of Business Administration degree in 1950 from the University of Miami. He received a Juris Doctor in 1952 from the University of Miami School of Law and worked in private practice in Fargo from 1953 to 1954. Before 1953 he worked at Goldena Mills in West Fargo. He served in the United States Air Force Judge Advocate General's Corps from 1954 to 1956 and as a United States Air Force Reserve Captain from 1956 to 1957. He worked in private practice in Washington, D.C. from 1956 to 1957. He served as an attorney and advisor in the Office of Opinion and Review for the Federal Communications Commission from 1957 to 1958. He served as in-house counsel to the Goldberg Feed & Grain Company in West Fargo from 1959 to 1983. He served as President and CEO of the Goldberg Feed & Grain Company from 1969 to 1983. He served as a member of the North Dakota State Senate from 1966 to 1974. He was Deputy Under Secretary for International Affairs and Commodity Programs at the United States Department of Agriculture from 1983 to 1989. He worked in private practice in Washington, D.C. from 1989 to 1991.

Trade Court service

On January 8, 1991, President George H. W. Bush nominated Goldberg to serve as a United States Judge of the United States Court of International Trade, to the seat vacated by Judge Paul Peter Rao. He was confirmed by the United States Senate on March 21, 1991 and received his commission on March 25, 1991. He took senior status on April 2, 2001, and was succeeded by Judge Timothy C. Stanceu.

Notes

References

External links
 Senior Judge Richard W. Goldberg Biography on U.S. Court of International Trade website
Confirmation hearings on federal appointments: hearings before the Committee on the Judiciary, United States Senate, One Hundred Second Congress, first session, on confirmation hearings on appointments to the federal judiciary. pt. 1 (1992) 

1927 births
Judges of the United States Court of International Trade
Living people
Lawyers from Fargo, North Dakota
University of Miami Business School alumni
Republican Party North Dakota state senators
University of Miami School of Law alumni
20th-century American judges
United States Under Secretaries of Agriculture
United States federal judges appointed by George H. W. Bush